Rudi Valenta (24 March 1921 – 15 July 2001) was an Austrian cyclist. He competed in the individual and team road race events at the 1948 Summer Olympics.

Major results
1946
 1st Vienna–Graz–Vienna
1947
 2nd Vienna–Graz–Vienna
 3rd Overall Tour of Austria
1949
 2nd Road race, National Road Championships
 2nd Vienna–Graz–Vienna
1950
 1st Vienna–Graz–Vienna
 1st  Road race, National Road Championships
1951
 1st Vienna–Graz–Vienna
 2nd Bol d'Or
 3rd Road race, National Road Championships

References

External links
 

1921 births
2001 deaths
Austrian male cyclists
Olympic cyclists of Austria
Cyclists at the 1948 Summer Olympics
Cyclists from Vienna